The 2014–15 West of Scotland Super League Premier Division was the thirteenth Super League Premier Division competition since the formation of the Scottish Junior Football Association, West Region in 2002. The season began on 30 August 2014. The winners of this competition were eligible to enter round one of the 2015–16 Scottish Cup. The two last placed sides are relegated to the Super League First Division. The third-bottom placed side will enter the West Region league play-off, a two-legged tie against the third placed side in the Super League First Division, to decide the final promotion/relegation spot.

Auchinleck Talbot won their third successive title on 23 May 2015.

Member clubs for the 2014–15 season
Auchinleck Talbot were the reigning champions.

Troon and Beith Juniors were promoted from the Super League First Division, replacing the automatically relegated Pollok and Largs Thistle.

Shotts Bon Accord claimed a third promotion spot after defeating Kirkintilloch Rob Roy in the West Region League play-off.

Managerial changes

League table

Results

West Region League play-off
Kirkintilloch Rob Roy, who finished third in the Super League First Division, defeated Shotts Bon Accord 4 – 1 on aggregate in the West Region League play-off. Rob Roy will replace Shotts in the 2015–16 West of Scotland Super League Premier Division.

References

6
SJFA West Region Premiership seasons